Tim Rudd (born November 30, 1960) is an American politician and a member of the Republican Party. He was elected to the Tennessee House of Representatives in 2016, representing District 34.

2018 House election 
The results for the District 34 House election were:

Early life and pre-politics career 
Tim Rudd attended Smyrna High School and Middle Tennessee State University. Rudd worked in the real estate business with Coldwell Banker Snow & Law beginning in 1998. Rudd has lived in Rutherford County, Tennessee for 45 years.

Religious freedom controversy 
Rudd was the sponsor of HB-0836. The measure permits adoption and foster care agencies funded by taxpayers to discriminate against LGBT people based upon "religious beliefs or moral convictions."

Committees 
Rudd was a member of the Insurance and Banking and State Government Committees and the Insurance and Banking Subcommittee.

He is a member of the Insurance and Local Committees and the Property and Casualty Subcommittee. He chairs the Elections and Campaign Finance Subcommittee.

Legislative initiatives 
Rudd has advocated for bills such as; the protection of the unborn, retaining traditional gender labels, better supervising child sexual predators, freedom of speech through signs on personal property, protection of the Second Amendment, National Guard education financial assistance,  Middle College scholarships, reducing the size of government, worker's compensation reform and educator assistance bills.

On June 9, 2020, Rudd voted as a member of the House Naming, Designating, & Private Acts Committee against removal of a bust honoring Ku Klux Klan Grand Wizard Nathan Bedford Forrest from the Tennessee State Capitol building.

Beliefs and values 
Rudd is a Baptist. He is a conservative. Rudd opposes reproductive rights and is an opponent of abortion for any reason. He opposes same-sex marriage, claiming that traditional marriage forms the backbone for families, making stable society.

References 

1960 births
Republican Party members of the Tennessee House of Representatives
Living people
21st-century American politicians